The Ford Fiesta Mk3 was the third generation of the Ford Fiesta supermini built by Ford Europe. Originally introduced in 1989, the Mk3 represented the biggest change to the Fiesta since the original car was introduced in 1976. In addition to the 3-door hatchback and panel van versions that had formed the Fiesta range, a 5-door hatchback was also added. The Fiesta Mk3 was replaced by the Fiesta Mk4 in 1995, but remained on sale until early 1997. The Mk4 was a major restyle of the Mk3, but had the same chassis.

The Fiesta Mk3 also spawned a high-cube panel van version in 1991, the Courier, and also shared its platform with the Ka of 1996, which was derived from the Fiesta Mk4.

History
The third generation Fiesta, codenamed BE-13 was unveiled at the end of 1988 and officially went on sale in February of the following year with UK sales commencing in April.  The car was based on a new platform ditching the old car's rear beam axle for a semi-independent torsion beam arrangement and looked radically different, addressing the principal weakness of the previous generation – the lack of a 5-door derivative, something that was by then available in its major rivals such as the Fiat Uno, Peugeot 205 and Opel Corsa/Vauxhall Nova.  The engine range remained broadly the same with the Valencia engine - now substantially revised and redesignated HCS (High Compression Swirl) - powering the 1.0L, 1.1L and 1.3L versions, and the CVH unit in larger capacities.  The LT diesel engine was enlarged to a 1.8L capacity.  

This model had the longest production life of any Fiesta to date, achieved the highest yearly sales of any Fiesta in the early 1990s – achieving a sales volume of 1 million units inside the first two years of production. A Fiesta-derived van, the Courier, was launched in 1991.

In the British market, Fuel injected engines only became available in 1991. They had been sold in countries with more stringent emissions controls since the introduction. In 1992 a number of prototype cars were produced by Ford fitted with direct injection two stroke engines produced by the Orbital Engine Corporation of Australia, with full-scale production anticipated by Ford in "two to three years time". The cars were tested extensively in the UK, but ultimately it was decided not to go ahead with production versions.  Major changes were introduced to the range in 1993; major structural improvements were made to improve safety, as well as a new immobiliser being fitted to petrol models. Revised door mirrors were also fitted, as were a line-up of fresh wheel trim designs.

This was then replaced by a Zetec 16 valve version in 1992, which also saw the RS Turbo being supplanted by the RS1800 as the CVH engine was being phased out. The XR2i name was dropped in early 1994, and the insurance-friendly "Si" badge appeared in its place on a slightly less sporty-looking model with either the 1.4 L CVH-PTE (a development of the CVH) or the 1.6 L Zetec engine.

From 1995 the vehicle was built and sold at the same time as the new Mark 4. To distinguish the car, trim levels were revised, and it was marketed as the "Fiesta Classic", with a small range consisting of Classic, Classic Quartz, and Classic Cabaret models, and a ‘Special Edition’ Frascati model. Production of these models took place in Valencia, Spain. This version continued until production finally ceased in early 1997.

Commercial models
As with the Mark 2, this generation was available as a panelled van in many markets. This range offered a limited number of engines. From late September 1990 the van was also available with the new catalyzed central injection (CFi) 1.4-liter petrol engine.

A box van version of the Fiesta appeared in the summer of 1991, but was sold as the Ford Courier.

RS Turbo

The Fiesta RS Turbo was a performance model of the Fiesta Mk3. It was introduced in April 1990 and production continued until 1992.

Based on the XR2i, introduced a year earlier, it was visually similar. The main differences were 14" alloy wheels (an inch larger and of a different design than those fitted to the XR2i) with 185/55 VR14 Pirelli P600 tyres, green rather than blue stripe mouldings, colour-coded rear spoiler and door pillars, opening rear quarter windows, green tinted glass and RS bonnet louvres. Anti-lock brakes and a "Quickclear" heated front windscreen were options at extra cost.

Inside the car the differences included Recaro seats trimmed in "Ascot In Raven" material and a grey leather trimmed gear knob and a three-spoke steering wheel (as opposed to the two-spoke used in the XR2i), which also had the RS Turbo logo embossed on the centre cap.

The RS Turbo's CVH engine retained the same 1597cc capacity as the XR2i, but had a lower compression ratio of 8:1. The Garrett T2 turbocharger supplied  of boost and was chosen as space between the engine and radiator prevented the use of the larger T3 from the Escort RS Turbo. As with the Escort, an air-to-air intercooler was fitted, although this was slightly larger on the Fiesta. The quoted power output was 133ps at 5500rpm, with 183 nm of torque at 2400rpm which gave the car a top speed of 133 mph and a 0-60 of 7.9 seconds.

The car was not generally well received with reviews citing poor handling and uncommunicative steering as its weak points. The spiralling insurance premiums brought on by the British joyriding epidemic of the early 1990s did not help either, with the car being a popular target for thieves.

RS1800 
The Fiesta RS1800 was introduced as the replacement for the RS Turbo in 1992.

Specifications

References

3rd
Cars introduced in 1989

1990s cars
Front-wheel-drive vehicles
Hatchbacks
Vans
Subcompact cars
Cars discontinued in 1997